is a town located in Fukushima Prefecture, Japan. , the town had an estimated population of 5,149 in 1741 households, and a population density of 33 persons per km².

Geography
Furudono is located in southern portion of Fukushima prefecture. The town is surrounded by forests and mountains.

Neighboring municipalities
 Fukushima Prefecture
 Iwaki
 Ishikawa
 Hirata
 Samegawa

Climate
Furudono has a humid climate (Köppen climate classification Cfa).

Demographics
Per Japanese census data, the population of Furudono peaked in around the year 1950 and has been in decline over the past 70 years. It is now less than it was a century ago.

History
The area of present-day Furudono was part of ancient Mutsu Province. During the Edo period most of the area was tenryō under direct control of the Tokugawa shogunate, with smaller portions as an exclave of part of the holdings of Omigawa Domain. After the Meiji Restoration, it was organized as part of Higashishirakawa District within the Nakadōri region of Iwaki Province. The villages of Minamoto and Takanuki were formed with the establishment of the modern municipalities system on April 1, 1889.

The village of Furudono was formed on March 31, 1955 with the merger of the villages of Miyamoto and Takanuki. Furudono was raised to town status on April 1, 1957. The administrative control of the town was transferred from Higashishirakawa District to Ishikawa District on April 1, 1994.

Economy
The economy of Furudono is primarily based on agriculture.

Education
Furudono has one public elementary school and one public junior high school operated by the town government. The town does not have a high school.

Furudono Middle School
Furudono Elementary School

Transportation

Railway
Furudono does not have any passenger rail service.

Highway

Local attractions
Koshidai Sakura – one of the 100 famous trees of Japan

International relations
 – Warkworth, New Zealand

References

External links

 

 
Towns in Fukushima Prefecture